= Comfort Kitchen =

Restaurant in Boston, Massachusetts, U.S.

- Interactive map of Comfort Kitchen

Restaurant information
- Established: January 2023
- Location: 611 Columbia Road, Boston, Massachusetts, 02125, United States
- Coordinates: 42°19′3″N 71°3′50.5″W

Comfort Kitchen is a restaurant in Boston, Massachusetts. Established in January 2023, the business was included in The New York Times's 2023 list of the 50 best restaurants in the United States. It was also a semifinalist in the Best New Restaurant category of the James Beard Foundation Awards in 2024.
